Taitosmith (stylized as TaitosmitH) is a Thai rock band that defines itself as "a modern phleng phuea chiwit (Thai protest song) band".

History
The band was formed in 2018 by two indie musicians, Itkron "Jaii" Pungkiatrussamee and Trinnasit "Most" Siripitchayasan. Then there were many others who joined until six was complete. They achieved rapid success with two easy listening singles Pattaya Lover and Pen Ta Li Tone (เป็นตะลิโตน) along with being invited to join the Thai PBS show "Nak Phajol Phleng", followed up with the third single Hello Mama in the same genre at the end of the year with lyrics in English mixed with Isan dialect.

The band has signed with Gene Lab in GMM Grammy network because the executive Panthapol "Ohm" Prasarnrajkit of the band Cocktail have watched the music clip Daeng Kub Kheo (แดงกับเขียว; "Red and Green") so they were persuaded to join in with the release of their first album TaitosmitH in 2019.

In early 2022, Taitosmith released the second album Phuea Chiwit Ku (เพื่อชีวิตกู; "For My Life") with a song that became viral in TikTok Nak Leng Kao (นักเลงเก่า; "Former Gangster") which is the soundtrack of the popular crime film 4 Kings that the vocalist Jaii also starred. Along with another song  Thai Tae (ไทเท่; "Cool Thai") that features with the late luk thung (Thai country song) singer and national artist Waiphot Phetsuphan. It became Phetsuphan's last work.

Taitosmith's songs focuses on aspects of society, human life, economic issues, as well as political satire.

Name of the band "Taitosmith" consists of three elements. Tai (ไท) means "freedom", tos (ทศ) means "ten" and mith (มิตร) means "friendship". The overall meaning is "a group of 10 freedom lovers who start and run everything in friendship". Even though there were only six people, but they also remembered the people involved both in front and behind the scenes of their success. Therefore, a descriptive name of ten is used.

The band's symbol resembles a Sao Chingcha (giant swing) or a Paifang (traditional Chinese arch) owing the band's name is a play on the words of the two English letters T and H.

Members
Itkron "Jaii" Pungkiatrussamee – vocals, guitar
Trinnasit "Most" Siripitchayasan – vocals, guitar
Pannasit "Min" Sukahotu – guitar solo
Thanakit "J" Songmuang – keyboard
Jatsada "Jat" Panya – bass guitar
Patanapoom "Tuke" Chaumpol – drums

Discography

Studio albums 
TaitosmitH (ไททศมิตร; 2019)
Phuea Chiwit Ku (เพื่อชีวิตกู; 2022)

Special album
TaitosmitH Special Boxset (limited edition; 2021)

Original soundtrack

See also
Music of Thailand
Phleng phuea chiwit

References

External links

Thai rock music groups
Musical groups established in 2018
2018 establishments in Thailand
Musical groups from Bangkok